Euzophera cinerosella is a species of snout moth in the genus Euzophera. It was described by Zeller in 1839. It is found in most of Europe (except the Benelux, Ireland, Portugal and Ukraine), Turkey, Russia and China.

The wingspan 23–28 mm. Adults are on wing from May to August.

The larvae feed on Artemisia absinthium. They feed internally in the roots.

References

Moths described in 1839
Phycitini
Moths of Europe
Moths of Asia